Water Eaton may refer to the following places in England:
Water Eaton, Milton Keynes in Buckinghamshire
Water Eaton, Oxfordshire
Water Eaton, Staffordshire (Roman:PENNOCRVCIVM)